Country Feelin' is the eighteenth studio album by American country music singer Charley Pride released in May 1974 by RCA Records. It reached No. 15 on the Billboard Country chart. One single from the album, "We Could", reached No. 3 in the US country chart and No. 1 in the Canadian country chart.

Track listing

Production
Producer - Jack Clement
Recording Engineers - Bill Vandevort, Tom Pick and Al Pachuki
Recording Technicians - Ray Butts, Mike Shockley and Roy Shockley
Recorded in RCA's "Nashville Sound" Studios, Nashville, Tennessee.
Album Photography - John Donegan
Album Art director - Acy Lehman
Vocal Accompaniment by The Nashville Edition
"All His Children" arranged and conducted by Henry Mancini (from the motion picture Sometimes a Great Notion)

References

1974 albums
Charley Pride albums
Albums produced by Jack Clement
RCA Records albums